The border between Namibia and South Africa is  long. It runs along the Orange River from its mouth on the Atlantic Ocean to the 20th meridian east, and then northwards along that meridian to the tripoint with Botswana at the Nossob River.

History

European settlement at the Cape began with the Dutch East India company in 1652, and was taken over by Britain at the start of the 19th century. In 1847 the boundaries of the Cape Colony were expanded as far as the Orange River. In 1878 Walvis Bay, the only natural harbour on the coast of what is now Namibia, was annexed as an exclave of the Cape Colony. German settlement in Namibia, meanwhile, began in 1883 with the founding of Lüderitz. The colony of German South-West Africa was formally established in 1884.

The Heligoland–Zanzibar Treaty of 1890 delimited the boundaries between German and British spheres of influence in Africa. The German sphere in southwest Africa was defined in Article III, the relevant part of which reads as follows.

During the First World War German Southwest Africa was conquered by South African forces, and after the war South Africa was granted a League of Nations mandate to administer the territory. The border between South Africa proper and the Territory of South West Africa remained the same as the former colonial border, and when Namibia finally achieved independence in 1990 it became once again an international border. The South African exclave at Walvis Bay was transferred to Namibia in 1994.

Dispute

South Africa claims, on the basis of the 1890 treaty, that the border runs along the north bank of the Orange River. Namibia claims that it follows the middle of the river. The Constitution of Namibia explicitly claims the territory up to the middle of the river, while South Africa's Recognition of the Independence of Namibia Act denies any recognition of this claim.

Crossings

There are seven official border crossings, of which two are located in transfrontier parks and are dedicated for use by park visitors. The principal crossings are at Noordoewer/Vioolsdrif for traffic from Namibia to Cape Town, and at Ariamsvlei/Nakop for traffic from Namibia to Gauteng and eastern South Africa.

References

 
Borders of South Africa
South Africa
International borders